Annur Sree Mahavishnu Temple is the abode of Sree Narayanan is an ancient and highly revered one. The temple is famous as the dwelling place of GOD MAHAVISHNU who is ever ready to confer boon on those who seek it from his sacred premises and is easily pleased on His worshippers. The temple situates in the Annur Village, 3.5 km north of Payyanur Town.

History 
Scholars have opined that the place name ‘Annur’ is derived from "Ann" (Mahavishnu) the presiding deity of this place, Annur. The historicity of the temple goes back to the days of yore in oral history and also mentioned in the "Thottam Pattu "of various ‘Theyyams ‘of the region as further proof of its antiquity.

It is presumed that the glory and splendor of this shine was lost somewhere in the onward march of time. However, the pious worshippers of the deity were not lagging behind in rendering timely renovations of the temple and got rewarded by his blessing and this is part of the glorious history of this temple.

Elderly people still recollect some anecdotes as proof of the blessing of Sree Mahavishnu. At a time, when the earth was parched under the burning sun and not even a rain drops was forthcoming and the local people were engulfed by epidemics, they sought refuge in the temple.

The rarest "Varunimantra" was recited as chorus and a cauldron of payasam was offered to the god and surprisingly the local people were saved. Among the most offerings, the most important one is the Nivedyam of Payasam in a cauldron (Valiya Vattalam) and many people had their own testimony of this offering followed by unbelievable relief from their afflictions.

People suffering from various ailments from far and near come to this temple and pray God with folded hands for solace. God Mahavishnu is full of kindness to those who depend on him and the belief is that he never lets any devotee down in trying times and his grace many people lead a peaceful and prosperous life.

Quite different from other temples, the entrance of this temple is from the west and the idol is consecrated in that way. It was about 30 years since the dilapidated Prasada, Thrikovil including the idol and the ‘Mukha Mandapa‘ were renovated with the help of the principal deity.

It was clearly pointed out that the temple including the sanctum sanctorum is to be reconstructed including leveling of the temple precincts. As it is a very expensive venture we place all our hopes on the benevolent deity and the unstinted co-operation of the devotees. The benign bliss of Sree Mahavishnu may make your good self an instrument in this holy venture.

Poojas
Nada Thurakkal 5.30 Am
Usha Pooja 7.00 Am
Ucha Pooja 9.30 Am
Nada Adakkal 10.30 Am

Nada Thurakkal 5.30 Pm
Deeparadhana 6.30 Pm
Athazha Pooja 7.30 Pm
Nada Adakkal 8.00 Pm

Festivals
Vrichika Masathile THIRUVONA MAHOSTAVAM,
Prathishta Dina Mahostavam (Makara Masam 27),
Sri Krishna Jayanthi – Navarathri Agosham,
Ramayana Masacharanam,
Maha Shivarathri,
Aadyathmika Prabashanam,
Bagavatha Sapthaham,
Gita Yatnam,

Committee
President :Puthumana krishnan master
Secretary: E.K Poduval
Treasurer: Gopinathan

TEMPLE RENOVATION COMMITTEE
Chief Patron : Brahma Sri Kalagattu Illath Madhusoodhanan Namboothiri
Chair Man : Sadanam Narayanan
Treasurer : K.V Padmanabhan

See also
 Temples of Kerala

References

External links 
  official web site

Hindu temples in Kannur district